Venus in Furs is a 1967 sexploitation film directed by Joe Marzano and starring Barbara Ellen.  The script was written by Marzano and Ellen, suggested by the novel of the same name by Leopold von Sacher-Masoch.

Release
The film has been released on DVD by Something Weird Video in the US.

References

External links

American sexploitation films
1967 films
1960s exploitation films
BDSM in films
1960s American films